Daniel 'Dani' Nieto Vela (born 4 May 1991) is a Spanish footballer who plays for CD Atlético Baleares as a winger.

Club career

Espanyol
Nieto was born in Calvià, Mallorca, Balearic Islands. He graduated from RCD Espanyol's youth setup after playing with local club RCD Mallorca from ages 14–16, and made his senior debut with the reserves of the former in the 2010–11 season, scoring 15 goals in Tercera División.

On 30 June 2011, Nieto moved straight to Segunda División after signing a one-year loan deal with Girona FC. He played his first match as a professional on 26 August, coming on as a late substitute in a 1–4 home loss against Elche CF.

Nieto scored his first professional goal on 24 September, netting the last in a 4–2 home win over UD Las Palmas. He finished the campaign with eight starts and 1,088 minutes of action, as the Catalans narrowly avoided relegation.

Alcorcón / Eibar
On 4 August 2012, Nieto cut ties with Espanyol and subsequently joined AD Alcorcón also of the second level. However, after starting only once with the Madrid side, he moved to FC Barcelona B on 12 July of the following year.

On 31 July 2014, Nieto signed for SD Eibar, recently promoted to La Liga– his €75,000 transfer fee was the club's record signing. He made his debut in the competition on 30 August, replacing Ander Capa in the 62nd minute of a 1–2 defeat at Atlético Madrid.

Later career
On 24 August 2015, Nieto terminated his link at the Ipurua Municipal Stadium. Two days later, he joined Superleague Greece side Xanthi F.C. for an undisclosed fee.

On 24 January 2017, free agent Nieto signed a two-and-a-half-year contract with CD Numancia.

In January 2023, Nieto joined CD Atlético Baleares until the end of the season after terminating his contract at Racing de Ferrol.

Career statistics

Club

Honours

Club 
Independiente Valle
 Copa Sudamericana: 2019

References

External links

1991 births
Living people
Footballers from Mallorca
Spanish footballers
Association football wingers
La Liga players
Segunda División players
Segunda División B players
Tercera División players
RCD Espanyol B footballers
Girona FC players
AD Alcorcón footballers
FC Barcelona Atlètic players
SD Eibar footballers
CD Numancia players
Racing de Ferrol footballers
CD Atlético Baleares footballers
Super League Greece players
Xanthi F.C. players
Ecuadorian Serie A players
C.S.D. Independiente del Valle footballers
Spain youth international footballers
Spanish expatriate footballers
Expatriate footballers in Greece
Expatriate footballers in Ecuador
Spanish expatriate sportspeople in Greece
Spanish expatriate sportspeople in Ecuador